Eric Davis (born in Kansas) is an American actor, comedian, director, writer and clown.

Davis is best known for his one-man show Red Bastard and performing in the Cirque du Soleil productions Quidam and the role of Allan Smithee in Iris.

References

External links

Redbastard.com

People from Kansas
American male stage actors
American clowns
Living people
American male film actors
American circus performers
American acting theorists
American theatre directors
American male writers
Cirque du Soleil performers
American mimes
Year of birth missing (living people)